Synaphea tripartita is a shrub endemic to Western Australia.

The small clumped shrub blooms between July and October producing yellow flowers.

It is found in small area in the Wheatbelt region of Western Australia between Lake Grace and Kulin where it grows in gravelly-clay soils over laterite.

References

Eudicots of Western Australia
tripartita
Endemic flora of Western Australia
Plants described in 1995